Larry Sparks (born September 25, 1947) is an American Bluegrass singer and guitarist. He was the winner of the 2004 and 2005 International Bluegrass Music Association Male Vocalist of the Year Award. 2005, won IBMA for Album of the Year and Recorded Event of the Year for his album "40," celebrating his 40th year(2003) in bluegrass music.

Biography
Sparks was born and raised in Lebanon, Ohio. His family originated from Jackson County, Kentucky in the Appalachians. In his childhood, he used to listen to the Grand Ole Opry and to radio station WCKY. He learned to play the guitar when he was quite young influenced by artists such as Wayne Raney, Stanley Brothers, Tommy Sutton and Paul "Moon" Mullins. Although he had played in country music and rock bands while he was in high school, his bluegrass career began when he joined the Stanley Brothers in 1964. At that time he was playing in a local band in Middletown, Ohio: "Irvin MackIntosh and His Band" and a friend of his, banjo player Wilbur Hall, was acquainted with Moon Mullins - who had just arrived to Middletown - and Hall told Mullins about Sparks. Mullins, who knew the Stanley Brothers, recommended Sparks to them and he was hired after an audition. An extensive tour followed and he recorded for the first time in 1965 for a small label in Dayton, Ohio.

In December 1966, Carter Stanley of the Stanley Brothers died and Ralph Stanley was in need of a guitarist to replace Carter. "Ralph Stanley and His Clinch Mountain Boys" consisted of Ralph Stanley-banjo, Larry Sparks-guitar, Curly Ray Cline-fiddle and Melvin Goins-bass. Sparks moved to Clintwood, Virginia and got married.  With Ralph Stanley, Larry Sparks recorded the original versions of modern bluegrass standards including "I Only Exist", "Sharecropper's Son", and "Going Up Home To Live in Green Pastures".  In late 1969, he left the "Clinch Mountain Boys", formed the "Lonesome Ramblers" and began recording for Pine Tree Records. The first version of the "Ramblers" comprised Larry Sparks, David Cox, Lloyd Hensley, Joe Isaacs and Larry's sister Bernice Sparks. After Pine Tree Records he went to Old Homestead Records and then to Starday Records before moving to the bluegrass label Rebel Records in 1977. Over the years, his band has undergone numerous personnel changes. Banjo player and tenor singer Dave Evans has been one of the "Ramblers" most well-known members.

In 2005 Sparks performed at the Gettysburg Bluegrass Festival with the Lonesome Ramblers.

Selected discography
{| class="wikitable"
! Year
! Album
! width="60"| US Bluegrass
! Label
|-
| 1970
| Ramblin' Guitar
|
| rowspan="2"| Pine Tree
|-
| 1971
| New Gospel Songs
|
|-
| rowspan="2"| 1972
| Bluegrass Old and New
|
| Old Homestead
|-
| Ramblin' Bluegrass
|
| Starday
|
|-
| 1974
| Where the Sweet Waters Flow
|
| Old Homestead
|-
| 1977
| Sings Hank Williams
|
| rowspan="16"| Rebel
|-
| 1980
| It's Never Too Late
|
| June Appal
|-
| 1980
| John Deere Tractor
|
|-
| 1981
| Dark Hollow
|
|-
| rowspan="2"| 1982
| The Best of
|
|-
| The Testing Times
|
|-
| 1983
| Blue Sparks
|
|-
| 1984
| Lonesome Guitar
|
|-
| 1986
| Gonna Be Movin'''
|
|-
| 1988
| Silver Reflections|
|-
| 1989
| Classic Bluegrass|
|-
| 1992
| Travelin'|
|-
| 1994
| The Rock I Stand On|
|-
| 1996
| Blue Mountain Memories|
|-
| 2000
| Special Delivery|
|-
| 2003
| The Coldest Part of Winter|
|-
| 2005
| 40| align="center"| 10
|-
| 2007
| The Last Suit You Wear| align="center"| 4
| McCoury
|-
| rowspan="2"|2008
| Kentucky Banjo|
| Gusto
|-
| I Don't Regret a Mile|
| Sparks
|-
| 2009
| I Just Want to Thank You Lord|
| Rural Rhythm
|-
| 2011
| Almost Home| align="center"| 1
| Rounder
|-
| 2014
| Lonesome and Then Some: A Classic 50th celebration| align="center"|
|-
| 2019
| New Moon Over My Shoulder| align="center"| 
|-
| 2021
| Ministry in Song| align="center"| 
|-
|}

References

Vladimir Bogdanov, Chris Woodstra, Stephen Thomas Erlewine, 	All Music Guide to Country: The Definitive Guide to Country Music, 2003 (p. 710)
Thomas Goldsmith, The Bluegrass Reader, 2004 (p. 195-198)
Kurt Wolff, Orla Duane, Country Music: The Rough Guide, 2000  (p. 249-250)
John Wright, Traveling the High Way Home: Ralph Stanley and the World of Traditional'', 1995 (p. 117-122)

External links
Official website
Answers
Article on rebelrecords.com

1947 births
American country singer-songwriters
American bluegrass musicians
American male singer-songwriters
Living people
American bluegrass guitarists
American male guitarists
Rebel Records artists
People from Lebanon, Ohio
Singer-songwriters from Ohio
Guitarists from Ohio
20th-century American guitarists
People from Clintwood, Virginia
Country musicians from Ohio
20th-century American male musicians